The 2015 African Women's Handball Cup Winners' Cup was the 31st edition, organized by the African Handball Confederation, under the auspices of the International Handball Federation, the handball sport governing body. The tournament was held from May 15–20, 2015 in two venues: the Gymnasium of the Military Academy and the Gymnasium Oloumi, in Libreville, Gabon, contested by 10 teams and won by Clube Desportivo Primeiro de Agosto of Angola thus dethroning longtime reigning champion Petro Atlético which declined to defend its title citing financial reasons.

Draw

Preliminary rounds

Times given below are in WAT UTC+1.

Group A

* Note:  Advance to quarter-finals

Group B

* Note:  Advance to quarter-finals

Knockout stage
Championship bracket

5-8th bracket

Final standings

See also 
2015 African Women's Handball Champions League

References

External links 
 Tournament profile at goalzz.com
 CAHB official website

African Women's Handball Cup Winner's Cup
2015 in African handball